John Torrence Tate Sr. (July 28, 1889 – May 27, 1950) was an American physicist noted for his editorship of Physical Review between 1926 and 1950. He is the father of mathematician John Torrence Tate Jr.

Biography 
Tate was born on 28 July 1889 in Lenox, Iowa. He attended the University of Nebraska, studying electrical engineering, earning a BS in 1910. He continued at the University of Nebraska, shifting his focus to physics and earning an MA in 1912. Like many American students interested in pursuing advanced degrees in physics, he departed for Germany to further his studies, earning a PhD under James Franck in 1914, with a dissertation on "The Heat of Vaporization of Metals." He returned to the University of Nebraska as a faculty member, where he stayed until 1916, when he was offered a post at the University of Minnesota. With the exception of brief sabbaticals to conduct war-related work, Tate remained at Minnesota for the following 34 years. Tate Laboratory of Physics at the University of Minnesota is named in his honor.

Editor of Physical Review 
While a professor at the University of Minnesota, Tate presided over the growth of the Physical Review into a high impact journal. Physicist John H. Van Vleck, who was a colleague of Tate's at Minnesota from 1923 to 1928, recalled that in the early 20th century "The Physical Review was only so-so, especially in theory, and in 1922 I was greatly pleased that my doctor's thesis was accepted for publication by the Philosophical Magazine in England . . . By 1930 or so, the relative standings of The Physical Review and Philosophical Magazine were interchanged." Alfred Nier and John Van Vleck credited the rapid growth of the journal's size and influence in the 1920s to Tate's sensitivity to the importance of the emerging quantum revolution, and in particular the rapidity with which he published papers relating to quantum phenomena.

Reviewing Einstein and Rosen 
On the 1st of June 1936 Tate, as the editor of the Physical Review, received a submission from Albert Einstein and Nathan Rosen. Tate sent the submission to H.P. Robertson, who made an anonymous critical peer review (correctly) questioning the basic conclusion of the paper. On the 23rd of July, Tate returned the submission with the anonymous review. On the 27th of July, Einstein replied:

References 

20th-century American physicists
1889 births
1950 deaths
People from Lenox, Iowa
Medal for Merit recipients
Mass spectrometrists
University of Nebraska alumni
University of Minnesota faculty
Presidents of the American Physical Society